Pierre Cardin, born Pietro Costante Cardin (2 July 1922 – 29 December 2020), was an Italian-born naturalised-French fashion designer. He is known for what were his avant-garde style and Space Age designs. He preferred geometric shapes and motifs, often ignoring the female form. He advanced into unisex fashions, sometimes experimental, and not always practical. He founded his fashion house in 1950 and introduced the "bubble dress" in 1954.

Cardin was designated a UNESCO Goodwill Ambassador in 1991, and a United Nations FAO Goodwill Ambassador in 2009.

Career
Cardin was born near Treviso in northern Italy, the son of Maria Montagner and Alessandro Cardin. His parents were wealthy wine merchants, but lost their fortune in World War I. To escape the blackshirts they left Italy and settled in Saint-Étienne, France in 1924 along with his ten siblings. His father wanted him to study architecture, but from childhood he was interested in dressmaking.

Cardin moved to Paris in 1945. There, he studied architecture and worked with the fashion house of Paquin after World War II. He worked with Elsa Schiaparelli until he became head of Christian Dior's tailleure atelier in 1947, but was denied work at Balenciaga.

Cardin founded his own fashion house in 1950. His career was launched when he designed about 30 of the costumes for a masquerade ball in Venice, hosted by Carlos de Beistegui in 1951. Cardin inaugurated his haute couture output in 1953 with his first collection of women's clothing and became a member of the Chambre Syndicale, a French association of haute couture designers. The following year he opened his first boutique Eve, and  introduced the "bubble dress", which is a short-skirted, bubble-shaped dress made by bias-cutting over a stiffened base. He was the first couturier to turn to Japan as a high fashion market when he travelled there in 1957.

As haute couture began to decline, ready-to-wear ('prêt-à-porter') soared as well as Cardin's designs. He was the first to combine the "mini" and the "maxi" skirts of the 1970s by introducing a new hemline that had long pom-pom panels or fringes.

Beginning in the 1970s, Cardin set another new trend: "mod chic". This trend holds true for the form or for a combination of forms, which did not exist at the time. He was the first to combine extremely short and ankle-length pieces. He made dresses with slits and batwing sleeves with novel dimensions and mixed circular movement and gypsy skirts with structured tops. These creations allowed for the geometric shapes that captivated him to be contrasted, with both circular and straight lines. Cardin became an icon for starting this popular fashion movement of the early 1970s.

Inspired by space travel and exploration, Cardin visited NASA (the National Aeronautics and Space Administration) in 1970, where he tried on the original spacesuit worn by the first human to set foot on the moon, Neil Armstrong. Cardin designed spacesuits for NASA in 1970.

Cardin resigned from the Chambre Syndicale in 1966 and began showing his collections in his own venue. He also designed uniforms for Pakistan International Airlines, which were introduced from 1966 to 1971 and became an instant hit.

In 1971, Cardin redesigned the Barong Tagalog, a national costume of the Philippines, by opening the front, removing the cuffs that needed cufflinks, flaring the sleeves, and minimizing the embroidery. It was also tapered to the body, in contrast with the traditional loose-fitting design, and it also had a thicker collar with sharp and pointed cuffs. A straight-cut design was favored by President Ferdinand Marcos.

In 1975, Cardin opened his first furniture boutique on the Rue du Faubourg Saint-Honoré. In 1977, 1979, and 1983, he was awarded the Cartier Golden Thimble by French haute couture for the most creative collection of the season. He was a member of the Chambre Syndicale de la Haute Couture et du Prêt-à-Porter from 1953 to 1993.

Cardin's first American-made, mass produced home furnishing collection came in 1977 when Cardin partnered with Dillingham Manufacturing Company, Scandinavian Folklore Carpets of Denmark for Ege Rya Inc., and the Laurel Lamp Company.

Like many other designers today, Cardin decided in 1994 to show his collection only to a small circle of selected clients and journalists. After a break of 15 years, he showed a new collection to a group of 150 journalists at his bubble home in Cannes.

A biography titled Pierre Cardin, his fabulous destiny was written by Sylvana Lorenz.

A documentary on Cardin's life and career, House of Cardin directed by P. David Ebersole and Todd Hughes premiered to a standing ovation on September 6, 2019 at the 76th Venice International Film Festival in the Giornate degli Autori section, with Mr. Cardin in attendance.

Brand 

Pierre Cardin used his name as a brand, initially a prestigious fashion brand, then in the 1960s extended successfully into perfumes and cosmetics. From about 1988 the brand was licensed extensively, and appeared on "wildly nonadjacent products such as baseball caps and cigarettes".

A 2005 article in the Harvard Business Review commented that the extension into perfumes and cosmetics was successful as the premium nature of the Pierre Cardin brand transferred well into these new, adjacent categories, but that the owners of the brand mistakenly attributed this to the brand's strength rather than to its fit with the new product categories. The extensive licensing eroded the brand's credibility, but brought in much revenue; in 1986 Women's Wear Daily (WWD) estimated Cardin's annual income at over US$10 million.

In 1995, quotes from WWD included "Pierre Cardin—he has sold his name for toilet paper. At what point do you lose your identity?" and "Cardin's cachet crashed when his name appeared on everything from key chains to pencil holders". However, the Cardin name was still very profitable, although the indiscriminate licensing approach was considered a failure.

In 2011, Cardin tried to sell his business, valuing it at €1 billion, although the Wall Street Journal considered it to be worth about a fifth of that amount. Ultimately he did not sell the brand.

Automobiles 

Cardin entered industrial design by developing thirteen basic design "themes" that would be applied to various products, each consistently recognizable and carrying his name and logo. He expanded into new markets that "to most Paris fashion designers ... is rank heresy."

The business initiatives included a contract with American Motors Corporation (AMC). Following the success of the Aldo Gucci designed Hornet Sportabout station wagon interiors, the automaker incorporated Cardin's theme on the AMC Javelin starting in mid-1972. This was one of the first American cars to offer a special trim package created by a famous French fashion designer. It was daring and outlandish design "with some of the wildest fabrics and patterns ever seen in any American car".

The original sales estimate by AMC was for 2,500 haute couture "pony" and muscle cars. The special interior option was continued on the 1973 model year Javelins. During the two model years, a total of 4,152 AMC Javelins received this bold mirrored, multi-colored pleated stripe pattern in tones of Chinese red, plum, white, and silver that were set against a black background. The Cardin Javelins also came with the designer's emblems on the front fenders and had a limited selection of exterior colors (Trans Am Red, Snow White, Stardust Silver, Diamond Blue, and Wild Plum) to coordinate with the special interiors. However, 12 Cardin optioned cars were special ordered in Midnight Black paint.

Other interests 

Cardin owned a palazzo in Venice named Ca' Bragadin. Although he claimed that this house was once owned by Giacomo Casanova, some scholars have argued that it was owned by another branch of the Bragadin family, and that its usage by Casanova was "somewhat unlikely".

Personal life
Cardin self-identified as being mostly gay, but in the 1960s he had a four-year relationship with actress Jeanne Moreau. His long-term business partner and life partner was fellow French fashion designer André Oliver, who died in 1993.

Death
Cardin died on 29 December 2020, at the American Hospital of Paris, in Neuilly-sur-Seine, at the age of 98. No cause of death was given.

Distinctions 
 France: Knight of the Order of Arts and Letters (February 1983)
 France: Commander of the National Order of Merit (May 1985)
 Italy: Grand Officer of the Order of Merit of the Italian Republic (23 September 1987; Commander: 2 June 1976)
 Japan: Order of the Sacred Treasure, Gold and Silver Star (May 1991)
 France: Commander of the Legion of Honour (January 1997; Officer: April 1991; Knight: April 1983)
 Belarus: Order of Francysk Skaryna (7 January 2004)
 Monaco: Commander of the Order of Cultural Merit (2007)
 Russia: Order of Friendship (24 June 2014)

Notes

References

Further reading

External links

 Official website
 Pierre Cardin Museum
 

1922 births
2020 deaths
French businesspeople in fashion
French fashion designers
Commanders of the Order of Cultural Merit (Monaco)
Fashion accessory brands
Foreign Members of the Russian Academy of Arts
High fashion brands
Italian emigrants to France
LGBT fashion designers
Italian LGBT people
Luxury brands
Eyewear brands of France
Members of the Académie des beaux-arts
Menswear designers
Recipients of the Order of Francysk Skaryna
Dior people
People from the Province of Treviso
Red Cross personnel
FAO Goodwill ambassadors
20th-century French businesspeople
21st-century French businesspeople
UNESCO Goodwill Ambassadors